Joel Hinds (born 18 June 1987 in Derby) is a professional squash player who represents England. He reached a career-high world ranking of World No. 73 in August 2011.

References

External links 

English male squash players
Living people
1987 births